Eucalyptus corticosa, also known as Creswick apple-box or Olinda box is a species of small tree that is endemic to a small area in south-eastern New South Wales in Australia. It has rough, fibrous bark on the trunk and branches, dull green, lance-shaped to curved adult leaves, oval flower buds arranged in groups of seven in leaf axils and cup-shaped or hemispherical fruit.

Description
It has rough, fibrous to flaky, brownish bark on the trunk and larger branches. Young plants and coppice regrowth have leaves arranged in opposite pairs, dull green and narrow oblong in shape. Flowering has been recorded in June and the flowers are white.

Taxonomy and naming
Eucalyptus corticosa was first formally described in 1962 by Lawrie Johnson who published the description in Contributions from the New South Wales Herbarium from a specimen he collected near Olinda in New South Wales.  The specific epithet (corticosa) is a Latin word meaning "abounding in bark".

In 1988, George Chippendale included this species with Eucalyptus aromaphloia but it was resurrected by Ian Brooker and is accepted as a separate species by the Australian Plant Census.

Distribution and habitat
Creswick apple-box grows in woodland in shallow soil over sandstone but is only known from the Rylstone area in New South Wales.

References

corticosa
Myrtales of Australia
Flora of New South Wales
Trees of Australia
Plants described in 1962
Taxa named by Lawrence Alexander Sidney Johnson